Michael Waters (born 1949) is a poet and editor.  He currently teaches at Monmouth University, in West Long Branch, New Jersey. He received his BA and MA at The College at Brockport, State University of New York, MFA at the University of Iowa, and PhD at Ohio University.

References

Living people
1949 births
American male poets
American editors
Monmouth University faculty
State University of New York at Brockport alumni
University of Iowa alumni
Ohio University alumni